The Christmas Album is Roberta Flack's first holiday album and was released in 1997. The song, "As Long as There's Christmas" (a duet with Peabo Bryson), was from the direct-to-video Disney film, Beauty and the Beast: The Enchanted Christmas. The album was reissued by Punahele Productions under the title Holiday in 2003; this version omitted "As Long as There's Christmas".

Track listing
"The Christmas Song (Chestnuts Roasting on an Open Fire)" - 3:54
"There's Still My Joy" (Beth Nielsen Chapman, Melissa Manchester, Matt Rollings) - 3:30
"We Three Kings of Orient Are" - 6:08
"25th of Last December" (Gene McDaniels) - 4:55
"As Long as There's Christmas" (Don Black, Rachel Portman) - 3:45
Performed by Roberta Flack and Peabo Bryson
"Because This Child Was Born" (Shelton Becton) - 4:25
"When There's Love" (Shelton Becton) - 6:25
"The Little Drummer Boy" - 5:57
"O Come All Ye Faithful" - 4:34

References

Roberta Flack albums
1997 Christmas albums
Christmas albums by American artists
Contemporary R&B Christmas albums
Capitol Records Christmas albums